Katharina Schubert (born November 26, 1963) is a German television actress.  She was born in Wiesbaden.

External links

Reuter Agency Hamburg 

German television actresses
1963 births
Living people
People from Wiesbaden
20th-century German actresses
21st-century German actresses